Presidential elections were held in South Korea on 6 July 1978, the second elections held under the Restoration Constitution, which gave the members of the National Conference for Unification the power to elect the president.

The National Conference for Unification was elected on 18 May, and the newly sworn-in delegates proceeded to elect the president on 6 July. As in 1972, incumbent President Park Chung-hee was the only candidate. He was duly re-elected with the support of 2,577 of the 2,581 members. Park Chung Hee would continue in office for just over a year before his assassination on 26 October 1979 and the subsequent collapse of the Yushin regime.

National Conference for Unification election
The 2,583 members of the second National Conference for Unification were elected on 18 May 1978, with a voter turnout of 79%.

Presidential election 
By the time of the presidential election, one delegate had resigned and another had died, meaning there were a total of 2,581 delegates at the Conference on the day of the presidential election.

In order to be elected, a candidate had to receive the vote of over 50% of the incumbent members. With 2,581 delegates in office, Park had to receive at least 1,291 votes to be elected. He received 2,577 votes, 99.85% of the total possible.

As there was only one candidate registered, the only ways the delegates could express opposition to Park was by either abstaining or casting invalid ballots. The only delegate who cast a protest vote was Park Seung-guk of Daegu-2 District.

By region

References

1978 elections in South Korea
Presidential elections in South Korea
Single-candidate elections